Fifi Martingale is a 2001 French film directed by Jacques Rozier. The film is about a theater company attempting to put on a new play. It was Jean Lefebvre's last film.

Cast
Jean Lefebvre as Gaston Manzanarès
Lili Vonderfeld as Fifi
Mike Marshall as the Author
Jacques Petitjean as the Director
Yves Afonso as Yves Lempereur
François Chattot as Père Popelkov
Alexandra Stewart as the Ambassador 
Jacques François as the Ambassador 
Roger Trapp as The consul of Moldova
Luis Rego

External links
 

French comedy films
2001 films
2000s French films